Ahmet Zenbilci (born 1 October 1966 in Adana, Turkey) is a Turkish politician and member of the Turkish Parliament. He is a member of the Justice and Development Party and deputy for Adana.

References 

Living people
Turkish political people
1966 births